Elections to Tamworth Borough Council were held on 3 May 2007. One third of the council was up for election and the Conservative Party stayed in overall control of the council. Overall turnout was 31.9%

After the election, the composition of the council was:
Conservative 24
Labour 5
Independent 1

Election result

Ward results

References
2007 Tamworth election result
Ward results

2007
2007 English local elections
2000s in Staffordshire